Bneyel, Bednayel,   is a village in Koura District of Lebanon.

References

External links
 Bednayel, Localiban

Populated places in the North Governorate
Koura District
Sunni Muslim communities in Lebanon